Conjunto Atardecer  is a Regional Mexican band that specializes in the Duranguense genre.

History
Conjunto Atardecer formed in Santa Maria del Oro, Durango, in September 2000. The idea of forming this group stems from the concerns of three young students who were beginning to switch on some of the school festivals were much in demand, as well as private events.

Seeing that many people liked the group they were asked increasingly to private events, then they decided to invite two more members, thus reinforcing musically. They begin to rehearse, but not yet by the name that would identify them in their presentations, it was then that I had the idea of calling Conjunto Atardecer honoring that afternoon when the five came together for the first time.

From its inception, the group began to grow in popularity, which led it to record their first album entitled “CON TODO EL CORAZON” (FROM THE HEART) it held in Durango, and with very good public acceptance, and placing radio hits, they became the favorites of the region.

Some time later, the group launched what was his second production, which they called “ATARDECER CANTA CORRIDOS” (Sunset Sing Corridos),With that they soon conquered places like Chihuahua, San Luis Potosí and Zacatecas, and soon several Texas cities began to listen their material, allowing them to make their first appearances on American soil.

The overall success came immediately to Conjunto Atardecer, managing to get the attention of record companies and entrepreneurs, and becoming Universal, then they launched the following material entitled "MI ETERNO AMOR SECRETO"(My Secret Eternal Love).

This album MI ETERNO AMOR SECRETO" (My Eternal Love,) came to change the direction of the group, as it is now shaping up to be one of the most influential groups of Durango.

Their presence in radio, wasn't limited, tracks like “Debajo de los laureles”, “Yo te enseñé” y “Quiero pensar en ti”,(Under the laurels, I taught you and I think of you), sounded strongly becoming a musical phenomenon and toured throughout U.S..

From that moment, Conjunto Atardecer began harvesting a number of successes in 2008 included recording 10 albums, in addition to countless nominations and awards that cover Premios Lo Nuestro Awards, a Grammy, Furia Musical, and many others.

In mid 2008, the group released material number 11 of his career entitled "Se va Muriendo Mi Alma"(My Soul is Dying), and parallel to this, they completely went live production, recorded at concerts and that included the best duranguense your repertoire.

Now the hand of Disa Records / Universal, Conjunto Atardecer launches his latest album, called “CONTIGO PARA SIEMPRE” (With You Forever).

“CONTIGO PARA SIEMPRE”(With You Forever), is a record made with the musical essence of the group, with nearly a decade of musical career, have managed to be unique, keeping everything fresh, they carried a youthful style that characterized from its beginnings of the young group.

"Encontre" (Found) is the first single detached from production, it was released in August 2009, which also promoted the theme “No Pude Quitarte Las Espinas” (I Couldn't Take Out Your Thorns).

After this album, they release “LOS NUMERO UNO DEL PASITO DURANGUENSE” (THE NUMBER ONE OF PASITO DURANGUENSE) album that had been recorded for before but, was relaunched to the delight of their followers, this included one of his biggest hits titled "Antes De Que Te Vayas"(Before you go).

And to reinforce it,  “15 GRANDES DE LOS N°1 DEL PASITO DURANGUENSE” (15 Big Number 1 of the PASITO DURANGUENSE)" was later launched.

They are called “LOS N°1 DEL PASITO DURANGUENSE” (The No. 1 of the Pasito Duranguenze), this title was greatly earned by this groups long  workings.

“LLEGAMOS Y NOS QUEDAMOS” (We Arrived, And We'll Stay) is just the name of the new album of Conjunto Atardecer, whose unique style will surely was liked by their followers. Then they placed in the top of the charts in their first single "El Punto Final” (The End Point) in which they teamed with the institution duranguense musical of all time: Montez de Durango.

Both groups blend their harmonies and vocals to create a song that made history in the genre and its promotion and was accompanied with a video made in the city of Los Angeles, CA

And now, for the year 2012, Conjunto Atardecer comes with more force than ever with their new album "De Mil Maneras... Sin Limites" (A Thousand Ways ... No Limits) and her new hit "Te Vere Como Me Ves" (I'll See You as How You See Me) after three days of its release it have been placed as number one selling, Conjunto Atardecer maintained this place for three consecutive weeks, and their last two productions that have as a result be the most successful group Duranguense movement. The Billboard list have confirmed they will always remain the "Numero Uno Del Pasito Duranguense".

In January 2017, Conjunto Atardecer’s lead vocalist, Heraclio Cepeda announced on the group’s Facebook page via live video that the group was breaking up at the end of February of that year. He was to start a Norteño-Sax band called “H Norteña” and said that Conjunto Atardecer was splitting on good terms.

In January 2020, Conjunto Atardecer reunited and are recording and touring once again.

Discography
Puro Durango (2000)
Canta Corridos (2001)
Conjunto Atardecer (2003)
El Pasito De Durango Conjunto Atardecer Y Grupo Montez De Durango
El Pasito De Durango (2003)
Los Número Uno Del Pasito Duranguense (2004)
Amor Duranguense (2006)
En Vivo (2005)
Desde La Sierra De Durango (2005)
Cantan Corridos II (2005)
El Decimo; Y Siguen... Los Número Uno Del Pasito Duranguense (2006)
Las #1 De Los N.1 Del Pasito Duranguense (2007)
Se Va Muriendo Mi Alma (2008)
En Concierto (2008)
Dedicado a Ti (2009)
Contigo Para Siempre (2009)
Solo Junto a Ti (2010)
Llegamos Y Nos Quedamos (2011)
''De Mil Maneras... Sin Limites (2012)
Ahora Con Norteño (2013)
Se Me Va La Vida (Single/Sencillo) (2013)
Innovando Y Conquistando (2014)
Sesiones Acústicas (Album En Vivo) (2014)
Cada Quien (2015)
Escribiendote Con El (2021)

Members
Heraclio Cepeda (Vocals)
Jose Merardo Cepeda (Keyboards)
Jorge Sanchez (Keyboards)
Eslie N Lopez (Bass Drum)
Eduardo Enriquez (Drums)
Victor Navarro (Saxophone)
Alan Eduardo (Saxophone)

Past members
Mario Madrigal  (Vocals and Keyboards) 2000-2013 
Daniel Rubio (Keyboards)
Noel Godinez (Keyboards) 2003-2005
Roberto Villa (Drums) 2004-2009

References

External links
 

Duranguense music groups
Mexican musical groups